John G. Anderson (born 1948) is an American seismologist and Professor at the University of Nevada, Reno. Anderson specializes in studies of strong ground motion and seismic hazards. He was Director of the Nevada Seismological Laboratory from 1998-2009. He has published more than 150 articles and more than 90 abstracts. He completed a PhD in Geophysics from Columbia University in 1976 and a bachelor of science in physics from Michigan State University in 1970.  He received his high school diploma in 1966.

References
Web page at Nevada Seismological Laboratory, UNR

Living people
1948 births
American seismologists
University of Nevada, Reno faculty
Michigan State University alumni
Columbia University alumni